The traditional Chinese calendar divides a year into 24 solar terms. Chǔshǔ, Shosho, Cheoseo, or Xử thử is the 14th solar term that signifies the end of the hot summer season. It begins when the Sun reaches the celestial longitude of 150° and ends when it reaches the longitude of 165°. It more often refers in particular to the day when the Sun is exactly at the celestial longitude of 150°. In the Gregorian calendar, it usually begins around 23 August and ends around 7 September.

Pentads

鷹乃祭鳥, 'Eagles worship the Birds'
天地始肅, 'Heaven and Earth begin to Withdraw', alluding to the end of summer
禾乃登, 'Grains become Ripe'

Date and time

References 

Autumn
14